Introducing Phonology is a 1984 book by Peter Hawkins designed for an introductory course in phonology for both graduates and undergraduates.

Author
Peter Hawkins was a professor at Victoria University of Wellington working on different aspects of New Zealand English.

Reception
The book was reviewed by Richard Coates, Alan S. Kaye, Włodzimierz Sobkowiak and François Chevillet.

References

External links
Introducing Phonology

1984 non-fiction books
Phonology books
Linguistics textbooks
Routledge books
Hutchinson (publisher) books